Imama Amapakabo (born 27 July 1969) is a Nigerian football manager and a former football player.

Career

After being part of the Nigeria squad that won the inaugural FIFA U-16 World Championship in 1985, Amapakabo's parents stopped being opposed to him playing football.

During a game against Nigerdock while playing for Sharks, he stopped a game to "take a toilet break" but was actually trying to ease the pressure on his team. Despite this, Sharks lost 1-0 due to an error from Amapakabo.

In 2016, Amapakabo helped Rangers International win the Nigerian league despite being one of the youngest head coaches in the league.

References

1969 births
Nigerian footballers
Nigeria youth international footballers
Association football goalkeepers
Living people
Nigerian football managers